Planet Hemp is a Brazilian rap rock musical group, known for starting the career of rappers Marcelo D2 and BNegão for its lyrics supporting the legality of cannabis. The band was founded in Rio de Janeiro in 1993, with original members Marcelo D2, Skunk, Rafael, Formigão and Bacalhau. The band broke up in 2001 due to differences between the band members, and Marcelo D2 and BNegão are increasing focus on their solo projects.
Since 2013 the band reunited and there are plans for new albums.

Band members
 Marcelo D2 - lead vocals (1993–2001, 2013 - Today)
 BNegão - lead vocals (1994-1996, 1998-2001, 2013 - Today)
 Rafael Crespo - lead guitar (1993–2001, 2013 - Today)
 Formigão - bass guitar (1993–2001, 2013 - Today) 
 Pedrinho - drums (1997–2001, 2013 - Today)

Past members 
 Skunk - lead vocals (1993-1994)
 Bacalhau - drums (1993-1997)
 Black Alien - lead vocals (1997–2001)
 Ze Gonzales DJ

Discography 
 1995 - Usuário (Gold)
 1996 - Hemp New Year (Extended play)
 1997 - Os Cães Ladram, Mas a Caravana não Pára (Gold)
 2000 - A Invasão do Sagaz Homem Fumaça(Gold)
 2001 - MTV ao vivo (Gold)
 2022 - JARDINEIROS

References 

Musical groups established in 1993
Musical groups disestablished in 2001
Brazilian musical groups
Rap rock groups
Rap metal musical groups
Brazilian hip hop groups
1993 establishments in Brazil
2001 disestablishments in Brazil